Star-Myu (スタミュ Sutamyu, or STARMYU), with subtitle , is a Japanese original anime television series produced by C-Station and NBCUniversal Entertainment Japan and directed by Shunsuke Tada. It aired in Japan from October 5, 2015 to September 16, 2019 and was simulcast by Crunchyroll and Funimation.

The first season of the anime began airing in Japan on October 5, 2015 and concluded on December 22, 2015. It is licensed and distributed in North America by Funimation, who began releasing the series on Blu-ray Disc and DVD on March 7, 2017. The opening theme is "Dreamer" by Gero and the ending theme "Seishun COUNTDOWN" (星瞬COUNTDOWN) is performed by the main five voice actors (Natsuki Hanae, Kensho Ono, Arthur Lounsbery, Yoshimasa Hosoya and Tomoaki Maeno) as Team Otori.

Two OVA volumes served as the 13th and 14th episodes of the first season were released on July 27, 2016 and September 21, 2016, respectively. Team Otori (voiced by: Natsuki Hanae, Kensho Ono, Arthur Lounsbery, Yoshimasa Hosoya and Tomoaki Maeno) and Team Hiragi (voiced by: Nobuhiko Okamoto, Yuuma Uchida, Yoshitsugu Matsuoka, KENN, Kazuyuki Okitsu) both perform their own version of the opening theme "Yume・Iro" (ユメ・イロ, lit. Dream・Color) and the ending theme "C☆ngratulations!".

The second season aired between April 3, 2017 and June 19, 2017. The opening theme is "SHOW MUST GO ON!!" by Fourpe (voiced by: urashimasakatasen) and the ending theme is "Gift" by Team Otori (voiced by: Natsuki Hanae, Kensho Ono, Arthur Lounsbery, Yoshimasa Hosoya and Tomoaki Maeno).

Crunchyroll streams both seasons of the anime in the United States, Canada, United Kingdom, Ireland, Australia, New Zealand, South Africa, Iceland, Sweden, Norway, Denmark and Netherlands.

A third season aired between July 1 to September 16, 2019.

Episode list

Season 1

OVA 
The OVA project is set at Ayanagi Academy after the students finish the school festival and face the new year. On the day the current Kao Council members end their final duties and leave the academy, every team holds a performance during the graduation ceremony to offer their thanks.

Another OVA project has been announced to be released in October 2018. It will tell a story about Hoshitani and friends on Halloween.

Season 2

Season 3

References 

Star-Myu